Pieśniarz Warszawy is a 1934 Polish film directed by Michał Waszyński.

Cast
Eugeniusz Bodo ...  Julian Pagórski 
Maria Gorczyńska ...  Peppita 
Barbara Gilewska ...  Zosia 
Michał Znicz ...  Eustachy, Julian's uncle 
Władysław Walter ...  Duży Antoś 
Wiktor Biegański ...  Lolo - Julians friend 
Stanisław Łapiński ...  Detective Krópka 
Ludwik Fritsche ...  Zosia's father 
Henryk Malkowski ...  Cabaret Manager 
Henryk Rzętkowski ...  Franciszek 
Elżbieta Kryńska   
Roman Dereń   
Mieczysław Bilażewski

External links 
 
 Pieśniarz Warszawy at the Internet Polish Movie Database 

1934 films
1930s Polish-language films
Polish black-and-white films
Films directed by Michał Waszyński
Polish musical comedy films
1934 musical comedy films